San Fernando Airport is an airport serving the general area of San Fernando, located in the province of La Union in the Philippines. The airport is classified as a community airport by the Civil Aviation Authority of the Philippines, a body of the Department of Transportation that is responsible for the operations of not only this airport but also of all other airports in the Philippines except the major international airports.

It was extensively used as a landing strip by American forces when Wallace Air Station was still in operation.

No airlines currently serve the airport.

References

External links
 Aeronautical Charts by SkyVector

Airports in the Philippines
Transportation in La Union
Buildings and structures in San Fernando, La Union